City of Glass may refer to:

 Vancouver, British Columbia, Canada
 City of Glass (Paul Auster book), a 1985 novel by Paul Auster
 City of Glass (comics), a 1994 graphic novel adaptation by Paul Karasik and David Mazzucchelli
 City of Glass (Douglas Coupland book), a 2000 non-fiction book by Douglas Coupland
 City of Glass (Mortal Instruments), a 2009 young adult book by Cassandra Clare
 City of Glass (film), a 1998 film directed by Mabel Cheung
 City of Glass (TV series), a 2008 South Korean TV series
 City of Glass (Stan Kenton album)
 "City of Glass", a jazz composition by Robert Graettinger featured on the above album
 City of Glass, an album by the alternative rock band Love Ends Disaster!
 Westland (region), Netherlands  because of the many greenhouses in the region